Tirathaba aperta is a species of moth of the family Pyralidae. It was described by Embrik Strand in the year 1920. It is found in Taiwan.

References 

Tirathabini
Moths described in 1920